Lac Berthelot Water Aerodrome  is located on Lac Berthelot, Quebec, Canada. It is open from late May until mid-October.

References

Registered aerodromes in Abitibi-Témiscamingue
Seaplane bases in Quebec